Fake-Out (also released as Nevada Heat) is a 1982 American crime comedy film directed by Matt Cimber, written by Cimber and John F. Goff, and starring Pia Zadora, Telly Savalas, Desi Arnaz Jr., and Larry Storch.

Cast

Pia Zadora as Bobbie Warren
Telly Savalas as Lt. Thurston
Desi Arnaz Jr. as Det. Clint Morgan
Larry Storch as Ted
G. Wesley Stevens as Michelle
George Savalas as Pit Boss
Buddy Lester as Blackjack Player
Sammy Shore as Waiter
Nelson Sardelli as Danny Perelli
George Buck Flower as Merrich
Tim Rossovich as Roy
Matt Cimber as Don
Rusty Feuer as Happy Johnson
Mercedes Hawthorne-Maharis as Warden Curtis
Connie Hair as Roberta
Meshulam Riklis as Spiveck
Charlotte Laws as Sharon

Production
The film was Pia Zadora's second lead role in a feature. All her first three films as star were financed by the company of her then husband Meshulam Riklis (the others were Butterfly and The Lonely Lady). Matt Cimber, who directed Butterfly, also made Fake Out.

Zadora described it as  "a cops-and- robbers-and-nightclub-singer story, kind of like a long Kojak." She added the film "has me singing a little, but it's nothing I'm terribly proud of."

The film was mostly shot on location in Las Vegas, principally around the Riviera Hotel.

References

External links

Fake Out at TCMDB

1982 television films
1982 films
American television films
American action comedy films
Films directed by Matt Cimber
Films scored by Arthur B. Rubinstein
Films shot in the Las Vegas Valley
1980s English-language films
1980s American films